Penicillium confertum is an anamorph fungus species of the genus of Penicillium.

See also
List of Penicillium species

References

confertum
Fungi described in 1990